Zinc azide  is an inorganic compound composed of zinc cations and azide anions. It is a white, explosive solid that can be prepared by the protonolysis of diethylzinc with hydrazoic acid:

Properties 
Zinc azide is a coordination polymer which crystallizes in three polymorphs, all of which feature tetrahedral zinc centers and bridging azide ligands. α- crystallizes in the monoclinic space group and is stable, while the other two polymorphs are metastable. P21/n. β- is trigonal, space group P3221, and γ- is monoclinic, space group C2.

It is easily hydrolyzed, and attempts to prepare it in aqueous solution resulted in the precipitation of basic azides  (x = 0.9–1.0). Both the α- and β-forms were found to be very friction- and shock-sensitive, violently exploding in blue flashes, but can be made to decompose slowly by gentle heating, giving off nitrogen gas. In a sealed glass tube with inert atmosphere, this yields zinc nitride, .

References

azide
zinc
Explosive chemicals